Belle Mina is an unincorporated community in southeastern Limestone County, Alabama, United States. As of 2020 the population was estimated to be around 113 people. About 2 kilometers away is the Toyota Mazda plant that was completed in 2020. The population could grow with some new neighborhoods planned to be built in Bella Mina, and nearby the community.

History
The community of Belle Mina was named for the plantation of the same name that belonged to Governor Thomas Bibb, the second governor of the state of Alabama. It was originally called "Belle Manor", but because of southern pronunciation, the spelling changed over time. The name is derived from the French word "belle", meaning "beautiful". The plantation was situated along the Southern Railroad, and there was a station at or near the plantation. A post office was established in Belle Mina in 1878. The community served as the rail stop for Mooresville.

References

Unincorporated communities in Alabama
Unincorporated communities in Limestone County, Alabama
Huntsville-Decatur, AL Combined Statistical Area